Mabel, Fatty and the Law is a 1915 American short comedy film starring Fatty Arbuckle and Mabel Normand, and directed by Fatty Arbuckle. The film is also known as Fatty, Mabel and the Law (American alternative title) and Fatty's Spooning Days.

Cast
 Roscoe "Fatty" Arbuckle as Fatty
 Mabel Normand as Fatty's Wife
 Harry Gribbon as Hubby
 Minta Durfee as Hubby's Wife
 Joe Bordeaux
 Glen Cavender
 Josef Swickard
 Alice Davenport
 Al St. John
 Frank Hayes

References

External links

1915 films
Films directed by Roscoe Arbuckle
1915 comedy films
1915 short films
American silent short films
American black-and-white films
Silent American comedy films
American comedy short films
1910s American films
1910s English-language films